Suvi Pirjo Sofia Teräsniska (born in Kolari, Finland on 10 April 1989) is a Finnish singer signed with Warner Music Finland. She made her breakthrough with her single "Hento kuiskaus" (2008) from her debut album Särkyneiden sydänten tie.

Teräsniska has been married since 2014 and has three children.

Discography

Albums

Compilations

See also
List of best-selling music artists in Finland

References

External links
Official website

21st-century Finnish women singers
1989 births
Living people
People from Kolari